Peter Flache (born 4 March 1982) is a Canadian professional ice hockey Forward currently playing for the Straubing Tigers of the Deutsche Eishockey Liga (DEL).

Born in Toronto, Ontario, Flache was taken in the OHL Priority Selection by the Guelph Storm in the 6th Round (123rd overall) in 1999. He was later selected in the 2000 NHL Entry Draft by the Chicago Blackhawks, 262nd overall. On July 23, 2010, Flache returned to Germany from the Port Huron Icehawks to sign a one-year contract with Augsburger Panther of the DEL.

Career statistics

References

External links

1982 births
Adler Mannheim players
Augsburger Panther players
Canadian ice hockey centres
Chicago Blackhawks draft picks
Dayton Bombers players
Greenville Grrrowl players
Guelph Storm players
Gwinnett Gladiators players
Living people
North Bay Centennials players
Port Huron Icehawks players
Saginaw Spirit players
Ice hockey people from Toronto
Straubing Tigers players
Toledo Storm players
Canadian expatriate ice hockey players in Germany